Grey and Bell was a Taranaki electorate in the New Zealand Parliament from 1853 to 1881.

Population centres
The electorate covered the northern, rural part of the Taranaki Province. The localities of Inglewood and Waitara fell within Grey and Bell.

History
Thomas King resigned in 1855, but the seat was not filled before the next general election through a by-election. Brown resigned on 16 August 1856 to (unsuccessfully) contest the Taranaki superintendency. He was again elected in 1858 and resigned in 1860, when his militia service required his full attention.

In between Brown's terms, Lewthwaite represented the electorate, who resigned in 1858. Thomas King and William Cutfield King contested the 1860 election. The latter won the contest, but was killed in the New Zealand Wars before he could take up the seat. Robert Trimble won the 1879 election.

Members of Parliament
The following Members of Parliament represented Grey and Bell:

Key

Election results

1858 by-election

1856 by-election

References

Historical electorates of New Zealand
Politics of Taranaki
1853 establishments in New Zealand
1881 disestablishments in New Zealand